Mullard Limited was a British manufacturer of electronic components. The Mullard Radio Valve Co. Ltd. of Southfields, London, was founded in 1920 by Captain Stanley R. Mullard, who had previously designed thermionic valves for the Admiralty before becoming managing director of the Z Electric Lamp Co. The company soon moved to Hammersmith, London and then in 1923 to Balham, London. The head office in later years was Mullard House at 1–19 Torrington Place, Bloomsbury, now part of University College London.

Start-up
In 1921, the directors were Sir Ralph Ashton (chairman), Basil Binyon of the Radio Communication Co, C.F. Elwell and S.R. Mullard (Managing Director).

Partnership with Philips
In 1923, to meet the technical demands of the newly formed BBC, Mullard formed a partnership with the Dutch manufacturer Philips.  The valves (vacuum tubes) produced in this period were named with the prefix PM, for Philips-Mullard, beginning with the PM3 and PM4 in 1926. Mullard finally sold all its shares to Philips in 1927. In 1928 the company introduced the first pentode valve to the British market.

Factories

Mitcham
Mullard opened a new manufacturing plant at the end of New Road, Mitcham, Surrey in 1929. A second building was added in 1936. Both buildings had a very distinctive flat roof construction and were very similar to those at Philips' headquarters in Eindhoven, Netherlands. Co-sited with the Mullard buildings was the manufacturing complex for Philips Radios.  Mitcham was also home to the Mullard Application Laboratory.

Blackburn
In the late 1930s Philips opened a plant in Blackburn, Lancashire, and during the Second World War some operations were moved there from Mitcham; by the end of the war, nearly 3,000 were employed. Tungsten and molybdenum wire were produced on-site from 1954, and a glass factory was built in 1955. In 1962 over 6,200 were employed and Mullard described the Blackburn works as "the largest valve manufacturing plant in Europe".

By 1949 Mullard had produced a number of television sets, such as the MTS-521 and MTS-684. In 1951 Mullard was producing the LSD series of photographic flash tubes.

Others
Mullard had factories in Southport and Simonstone, both in Lancashire. The latter closed in 2004. There was also a sister factory at Belmont in Durham (closed in June 2005). Other factories included those at Fleetwood (closed in 1979) and Lytham St. Annes (closed in 1972). A feeder factory at Haydock closed in 1981. A small factory in Hove closed in the early 1970s.

Teletext

In the early 1980s, Mullard manufactured the SAA5050, one of the first teletext character generator modules made in the UK.

Semiconductors

Mullard owned semiconductor factories in Southampton and Hazel Grove, Stockport, Cheshire. 

Southampton (Millbrook Trading Estate) was a purpose-built plant, opened in 1957 for the manufacture of semiconductors. Production of germanium alloy transistors was transferred from Mitcham. 
At the same time the plant started the research, development and production of electro optical devices. Fabrication of planar devices on a mass production basis did not begin until 1966, when germanium sales were decreasing. 1967 saw the start of the development and production of integrated circuits. The plant was planned to be the biggest semiconductor facility in Europe, employing 3,000 people including 200 scientists and engineers.

In 1962 Associated Semiconductor Manufacturers (ASM) Ltd was formed by Mullard and GEC to combine the semiconductor development and production facilities of the two companies; Mullard owned two-thirds of the company and included the Southampton plant; GEC contributed their small factory in School Street, Hazel Grove, producing thyristors, rectifiers and power diodes. GEC pulled out of ASM Ltd in 1969.
In 1972 production was moved to a newly constructed factory nearby on Bramhall Moor Lane.

Both sites were later owned by NXP Semiconductors (formerly Philips Semiconductors). The Southampton site is now closed. The one in Hazel Grove, Stockport specialises in power semiconductor devices and is now Nexperia Manchester.

The first transistors produced by Mullard were the OC50 and OC51 point-contact types in 1952, which were not widely used. In 1953 Mullard moved to junction transistors, beginning with the plastic-cased OC10 series.  These were followed by the glass-encapsulated OC43...47, OC70/71, (released in 1957) and OC80 series (the output devices were metal encapsulated to facilitate heatsinking), which were produced in large numbers and copied by other companies, such as Valvo (another Philips subsidiary) and Siemens in Germany, and Amperex in the USA. RF transistors were the OC170 and OC171. All these were germanium PNP transistors. Mullard's first silicon transistors were the OC201 to OC207, PNP alloy types using the standard SO-2 metal-over-glass construction such as the OC200 shown. From about 1960 Mullard switched to using the BC prefix for silicon, and AC for germanium, eliminating the confusion of part numbers. in the mid 1960s the first plastic packages were introduced. In 1964 the company produced a prototype electronic desktop calculator as a technology demonstrator for its transistors and cold cathode indicator tubes.

Space science
In 1957 Philips-Mullard helped to set up the Mullard Radio Astronomy Observatory (MRAO) at the University of Cambridge. In 1966 the Mullard Space Science Laboratory (MSSL) was opened near Dorking, Surrey as part of University College London. The Royal Society Mullard Award for young scientists and engineers was set up in 1967.

Mullard brand name
Philips continued to use the brand name "Mullard" in the UK until 1988. Mullard Research Laboratories in Redhill, Surrey then became Philips Research Laboratories. As of 2007, the Mullard brand has been revived by Sovtek, producing a variant of the ECC83 and EL34.

Z Electric Lamp Company
The Z Electric Lamp Co. continued business into the 1970s operating from premises in Thornton Heath, southern Greater London, manufacturing lamps of specialised design. However, it closed due to the recession in the mid 1970s.

See also 
 Mullard–Philips tube designation
 MEL Equipment

50th Anniversary in 1970
To mark the 50th anniversary of the founding of the company, Mullard management decided to have a rose named after the company. Mullard's quest was simple, they wanted a world-beater, nothing less, so they contacted the renowned grower Sam McGredy IV in Northern Ireland. The naming fee of £10,000/$24,000 was a lot of money in 1970 and established a record fee for a new rose : Mullard Jubilee "Electron". To mark the occasion every employee received a "Mullard Jubilee” rose bush.

References

External links 

Mullard Semiconductors by Andrew Wylie
Some Mullard History on personal blog
History of Mullard Tubes
Mullard Valve Works in Blackburn

Defunct technological companies of the United Kingdom
Vacuum tubes
Guitar amplification tubes
Electronics industry in London
Electronics companies of the United Kingdom
Manufacturing companies based in London
Electronics companies established in 1920
History of the London Borough of Hammersmith and Fulham
History of the London Borough of Wandsworth
1920 establishments in England